German submarine U-253 was a Type VIIC U-boat built for Nazi Germany's Kriegsmarine for service during World War II.

The U-boat was laid down 15 November 1940 at the Bremer Vulkan yard in Bremen-Vegesack, launched on 30 August 1941 and commissioned on 21 October 1941. U-253 served with the 8th U-boat Flotilla for training and later served operationally with the 6th U-boat Flotilla from 1 to 25 September 1942. U-253 completed one patrol but did not sink any ships.

The cause of U-253s loss is not clear, but believed to be a British mine in the Northern Barrage.

Design
German Type VIIC submarines were preceded by the shorter Type VIIB submarines. U-253 had a displacement of  when at the surface and  while submerged. She had two shafts and two  propellers.

U-253 was fitted with five  torpedo tubes (four fitted at the bow and one at the stern), fourteen torpedoes, one  SK C/35 naval gun, 220 rounds, and two twin  C/30 anti-aircraft guns. The boat had a complement of between forty-four and sixty.

References

Bibliography

External links

German Type VIIC submarines
U-boats commissioned in 1941
U-boats sunk in 1942
World War II submarines of Germany
World War II shipwrecks in the Atlantic Ocean
1941 ships
Ships built in Bremen (state)
Ships lost with all hands
U-boats sunk by mines
Maritime incidents in September 1942